Doodle Champion Island Games is a 2021 role-playing browser game developed by Google in partnership with Studio 4°C. The game acted as an interactive Google Doodle in celebration of the 2020 Summer Olympics and 2020 Summer Paralympics as well as Japanese folklore and culture. The story follows Lucky the Ninja Cat as she competes in sport events across Champion Island to become the champion of the island, whilst completing multiple side quests such as helping people who are in need. The Doodle was removed on 6 September 2021 by Google but can still be played in Google Doodle archives.

The game features seven different mini-games themed around sports that appeared at the Olympics, including table tennis, skateboarding, archery, rugby, artistic swimming, sport climbing, and marathon.

Gameplay
Doodle Champion Island is a role-playing video game with elements of a sports game. The player controls a cat named Lucky around an island with seven different regions that resemble different Japanese locations and geography, such as bamboo forests and mountains. In each region, there are features of seven island champions who all specialise in a specific sport. The sports themselves are mini-games, where Lucky earns a Sacred Scroll upon winning the mini-game. By beating all seven champions and earning their scrolls, the player is named "Island Champion". The player can also join one of 4 teams each represented by a color and a creature from Japanese mythology. By competing in the mini-games, players accumulate points that are tallied onto a Global Leaderboard, with the highest-scoring team being rewarded the title of winner by the end of the Olympics.

All the mini-games cover different genres of video games. For example, the Artistic Swimming event takes the form of a Dance Dance Revolution style rhythm game, whilst the Skateboarding event features a trick system similar to Tony Hawk's Pro Skater.

Additionally, each region holds plenty of side quests for the player to seek out. These side quests involve Lucky helping out the residents of the island in a variety of tasks such as item fetching and trade sequences. Some side quests can also unlock harder versions of the original mini-games. All these side quests can earn the player a trophy which can be viewed in a house in the center of the island, named The Trophy House, with 24 to collect in total as of the Paralympics update.

As of the Summer Paralympic Games 2020, two new side quests have been added, with one leading to an advanced version of Rugby. There is also an advanced version of archery made available from the beginning. Players may also reset their progression (for instance, to switch teams) by 'leaving the Champion Island' (after talking to the Komainu gatekeepers present at the pier to Lucky's boat once all 7 scrolls have been obtained and side-quests completed, with the game's credits then being shown as Lucky departs the island on her boat) or simply selecting “Start a new game” in Settings.

Plot

At the start of the game, Lucky arrives by boat at Champion Island, a place where athletes from around the globe compete with each other. She is then confronted by two Komainu, who challenges her to a match of Table Tennis to test her skills. Once Lucky beats the pair, they believe her to be The Chosen One and tell her of the seven champions of the island and that beating them would restore order to the island and make her the Island Champion.

Lucky can then choose the order to compete against the champions and beating each champion will earn her one of seven Sacred Scrolls. These are:
 The Kijimuna, a tribe that hosts marathons along a beach.
 The Tengu, who masters table tennis in a village now abandoned in a bamboo forest.
 Princess Oto-hime and Urashima Taro, who compete in artistic swimming underwater.
 Yoichi, master of archery near the island's lotus pond.
 The Oni, a group of trolls who are champions of the island's rugby. In this event, Lucky is aided by Momotaro and his friends.
 Fukuro, an owl who sits at the top of the island's mountain and observes the Climbing event.
 Tanuki, master of the Skateboarding event taking place in Tanooki City.

After obtaining all seven Sacred Scrolls and beating all the champions of the island, a large cherry blossom tree bursts into bloom in the center of the island, and falling petals rain over the island. The people of the island then congratulate Lucky on becoming the Island Champion.

If Lucky collects 23 of the 24 trophies, selecting the podium with no trophy reads the message "don't trust the bird", activating the final side quest. Lucky is then tasked with finding the true trophy master, who is revealed to be Momo, the black cat from Magic Cat Academy, the Google Doodle for Halloween 2016 and 2020. This changed when the Paralympics made their debut, and anyone who has completed the 22 previous side quests and plays the Paralympic game without starting afresh can complete the 23rd and 24th quests without losing history of the last quest.

Development 
The Doodle team collaborated with Studio 4°C to help produce the many anime-styled cutscenes throughout the game. In the early stages of development, the team researched for several Japanese folk stories and legendary characters, as well as mythical beings from Japanese folklore. As a result, the main character, Lucky (a calico cat), was made as it depicts luckiness. Each sport champion also features a legendary or mythical character.

The game itself acts as an homage to 16-bit gaming on top of Japanese folklore.

Art lead for Google Doodle, Nate Swinehart, said: "We wanted to make the Doodle for the Champion Island Games to really create an opportunity for the world to compete globally together and to learn Japanese culture at the same time."

The game's soundtrack was composed by Qumu, a music artist known for remixing video game music on YouTube, with 246,000 subscribers as of July 2022.

References

External links 
 

2020 Summer Olympics
2020 Summer Paralympics
2021 video games
Athletics video games
Browser games
Games on Google platforms
Multiple-sport video games
Retro-style video games
Rugby football video games
Single-player video games
Skateboarding video games
Table tennis video games
Summer Olympic video games
Video games about cats
Video games developed in the United States
Video games featuring female protagonists
Video games set on fictional islands
Fantasy sports video games